Gerrit "Gert" van den Berg (24 May 1903 – ?) was a Dutch cyclist who won a bronze medal in the road race at the 1925 World Championships.

References

1903 births
Year of death missing
Dutch male cyclists
Cyclists from Amsterdam
UCI Road World Championships cyclists for the Netherlands
20th-century Dutch people